This is a list of state prisons in Oklahoma. It does not include federal prisons or county jails located in the state of Oklahoma.

State prisons 

Charles E. Johnson Correctional Center
Dick Conner Correctional Center
Dr. Eddie Warrior Correctional Center (inmate capacity 783)
Howard McLeod Correctional Center (inmate capacity 616)
Jackie Brannon Correctional Center (inmate capacity 737)
James Crabtree Correctional Center
Jess Dunn Correctional Center (inmate capacity 1129)
Jim E. Hamilton Correctional Center (inmate capacity 680)
John Lilley Correctional Center (inmate capacity 820)
Joseph Harp Correctional Center
Lexington Assessment and Reception Center
Mabel Bassett Correctional Center
Mack Alford Correctional Center
North Fork Correctional Facility (formerly managed by CoreCivic) 
Northeast Oklahoma Correctional Center (inmate capacity 501)
North Fork Correctional Center
Oklahoma State Penitentiary
William S. Key Correctional Center
Clara Waters Community Corrections Center
Enid Community Corrections Center
Kate Barnard Community Corrections Center (inmate capacity 260)
Lawton Community Corrections Center
Oklahoma City Community Corrections Center
Union City Community Corrections Center

Private prisons 

 Cimarron Correctional Facility- CoreCivic
 Davis Correctional Facility- CoreCivic
 Lawton Correctional Facility- GEO
 Diamondback Correctional Facility- CoreCivic (closed)
 Great Plains Correctional Facility- GEO (closed)

Work Center 

Oklahoma State Reformatory Work Center l

External links 
Oklahoma Department of Corrections

 
Oklahoma
Prisons